Jarrett Charles Coleman (b. circa 1990) is an American politician and pilot. He is a Republican member of the Pennsylvania State Senate, and represents the 16th District.

Coleman studied to become a pilot at Lehigh Carbon Community College and later Embry–Riddle Aeronautical University, where he earned a Bachelor of Science in aviation and a Master of Business Administration. He worked as a pilot for CommuteAir, Compass Airlines, and JetBlue.

Coleman was elected to the school board for the Parkland School District in November 2021, running on his opposition to the district's response to the COVID-19 pandemic — including remote learning and mask requirements for children — and the teaching of critical race theory.

Coleman successfully challenged 17-year incumbent Pat Browne in the 2022 Republican primary for Pennsylvania's 16th Senate District, narrowly defeating Browne by only 24 votes. He went on to win the general election, defeating Democrat Mark Pinsley.

References

External links
Campaign website

Living people
21st-century American politicians
Embry–Riddle Aeronautical University alumni
Republican Party Pennsylvania state senators
Year of birth missing (living people)

Politicians from Lehigh County, Pennsylvania